In particle physics, the hidden sector, also known as the dark sector, is a hypothetical collection of yet-unobserved quantum fields and their corresponding hypothetical particles. The interactions between the hidden sector particles and the Standard Model particles are weak, indirect, and typically mediated through gravity or other new particles. Examples of new hypothetical mediating particles in this class of theories include the dark photon, sterile neutrino, and axion.

In many cases, hidden sectors include a new gauge group that is independent from the Standard Model gauge group. The hidden sectors are commonly predicted by the models from string theory. They may be relevant as a source of dark matter and supersymmetry breaking, solving the Muon g-2 anomaly and beryllium-8 decay anomaly.

See also 
 Fifth force
 Dark energy
 Dark matter
Dark radiation
Higgs sector

References

Physics beyond the Standard Model